Platygobiopsis akihito, the Imperial goby, is a species of goby known only from the area of Flores, Indonesia.

Etymology
The goby is named for Emeritus Emperor Akihito of Japan (b. 1933), honoring his contribution to the expansion of knowledge of gobioid fishes.

References

Gobiidae
Fish of Indonesia
Taxa named by Victor G. Springer
Taxa named by John Ernest Randall
Fish described in 1992